The Egypt women's national volleyball team represents Egypt in international women's volleyball competitions and friendly matches.

World Championship
 1952 to 1986 — did not participate
 1990 — 16th place
 1994 to 1998 — did not participate
 2002 — 22nd place
 2006 — 23rd place
 2010 to 2014 — did not participate

African Championship
 1976 — 1st place
 1985 — 2nd place
 1987 — 3rd place
 1989 — 1st place
 1991 — 2nd place
 1993 — 2nd place
 2003 — 1st place
 2005 — 3rd place
 2007 — 4th place
 2011 — 3rd place

All Africa games
 1978 : did not compete
 1987 : 1st place
 1991 : 2nd place
 1995 : 3rd place
 1999 : 2nd place
 2003 : 2nd place
 2007 : 6th place
 2011 : did not compete

Pan Arab Games
1992 : 1st place
1997 : 1st place
1999 : 1st place
2011 : 1st place

Mediterranean Games 
1975 : 4th
1979 : 6th
1983 to 1987 : did not compete
1991 : 7th
1993 to 2009 : did not compete
2022 : 6th

See also
Egypt men's national volleyball team

References
Egypt Volleyball Federation

National women's volleyball teams
Volleyball
Volleyball in Egypt
Women's sport in Egypt